Statistics of Nadeshiko League Cup in the 2017 season.

Overview
JEF United Chiba Ladies won the championship.

Results

Division 1

Qualifying round

Group A

Group B

Final round

Semifinals
Nippon TV Beleza 2-2 (pen 4-5) Urawa Reds Ladies
INAC Kobe Leonessa 0-1 JEF United Chiba Ladies

Final
Urawa Reds Ladies 0-1 JEF United Chiba Ladies

Division 2

Qualifying round

Group A

Group B

Final
Nippon Sport Science University Fields Yokohama 1-1 (pen 4-5) Cerezo Osaka Sakai Ladies

References

Nadeshiko League Cup
2017 in Japanese women's football